The CA Foundation Course is the entrance level for the chartered accountancy course offered by the Institute of Chartered Accountants of India (ICAI). Earlier, it was known as the Common Proficiency Test. CA Foundation contains 5 series of papers. The CA Foundation exam replaced the CA-CPT exam and now is conducted by the Institute of Chartered Accountants of India (ICAI) twice a year. After the CA Foundation exam, students need to complete the Intermediate and Final levels as well to 
become a chartered accountant

Eligibility 
The candidate can register for CA Foundation after passing the secondary school examinations (Class-X) and appear in the foundation exam after qualifying for the 12th examinations. ICAI has allowed provisional registration for 10th class passed students.

Test model 
CA Foundation is a partially subjective and a partially objective test comprising the following four papers: 
 Principles and Practice of Accounting
 Business Laws and Business Correspondence and Reporting
 Business Mathematics, Logical Reasoning & Statistics
 Business Economics and Business and Commercial Knowledge

The first two papers are subjective while the latter two are objective. Each paper is worth 100 marks for a total of 400 marks.

Registration 
A candidate has to register for CA Foundation Course by filling up the online registration form available on the ICAI website. The last date for registration is December/June for the May/Nov terms of examination. Registration for the CA Foundation course is valid only for three years.

Date of the exams 
Exams for the CA Foundation are held in May and November. ICAI announces the CA Foundation exam schedule in the month of July for the November term of examination and in the month of January for the May term of examination.

Exemption 
Graduates, post-graduates and students with equivalent degrees are exempt from the course requirement. Commerce graduates with 55% and other graduates with 60% marks can take direct admission for the CA Intermediate

See also 
 Education in India

References

External links 
 CA Foundation - ICAI

Accounting in India